Blane may refer to:

Mountains in Canada
Mount Blane (Alberta)
Mount Blane (British Columbia)

Names
Blane (given name)
Blane (surname)

See also
Blaine (disambiguation)
Blain (disambiguation)